Nenad Jestrović (Serbian Cyrillic: Ненад Јестровић; born 9 May 1976) is a Serbian former professional footballer who played as a forward.

Club career
Jestrović started his playing career with Radnički Obrenovac in the early 1990s. He then played for OFK Beograd in the First League of FR Yugoslavia, before moving abroad for the first time in the summer of 1997. Jestrović spent three years in France, representing SC Bastia (1997–1998) and Metz (1998–2000). He then moved to Belgian club Mouscron, having a lot of success in the 2000–01 season.

Jestrović spent the best years of his career at Anderlecht (2001–2005), becoming the Belgian First Division top scorer in the 2004–05 season. He made a total of 80 league appearances and scored 55 goals, before leaving the Brussels club in January 2006. Jestrović then spent a year and a half in the United Arab Emirates, playing for Al Ain and Al Nasr.

Jestrović also became the Serbian SuperLiga top scorer in the 2007–08 season while playing for Red Star Belgrade. He split his last season between Turkish club Kocaelispor (2008) and his former club Metz (2009), before retiring in the summer of 2009.

International career
At international level, Jestrović represented Serbia and Montenegro from 2003 to 2005, making 12 appearances and scoring five goals.

Honours
Individual
 Serbian SuperLiga top scorer: 2007–08

External links
 
 

1976 births
Living people
People from Obrenovac
Serbian footballers
Association football forwards
Serbia and Montenegro international footballers
FK Radnički Obrenovac players
OFK Beograd players
Red Star Belgrade footballers
Serbian SuperLiga players
SC Bastia players
FC Metz players
Ligue 1 players
Ligue 2 players
Royal Excel Mouscron players
R.S.C. Anderlecht players
Belgian Pro League players
Al Ain FC players
Al-Nasr SC (Dubai) players
UAE Pro League players
Kocaelispor footballers
Süper Lig players
Serbian expatriate footballers
Expatriate footballers in France
Serbia and Montenegro expatriate sportspeople in France
Expatriate footballers in Belgium
Serbia and Montenegro expatriate sportspeople in Belgium
Expatriate footballers in the United Arab Emirates
Serbian expatriate sportspeople in the United Arab Emirates
Expatriate footballers in Turkey
Serbian expatriate sportspeople in Turkey
Serbia and Montenegro footballers
Serbia and Montenegro expatriate footballers